OMGWTFBIBLE is a Jewish podcast hosted by comedian David Tuchman and produced by Jewcy. The show translates the Hebrew Bible into a serialized comedy show.

Background 
The show is a Jewish podcast hosted by comedian David Tuchman. The goal of the show is to retranslate the Bible while providing commentary on the ridiculous aspects of the various stories. Each month a new episode is recorded live with a different guest each time. The inspiration for the show came from some advice that Tuchman received from his writing professor who said "If you want inspiration, all you have to do is read the Bible cover to cover." The show was produced by Jewcy, the online Jewish magazine, beginning with episode nineteen. Episodes were available on Jewcy the day before they were released elsewhere.

The first year of the show was solely dedicated to discussing the book of Genesis. Episode number twelve featured Elissa Goldstein as the guest of the show, which was recorded live at the East Village bar in New York City. The show recorded episode twenty-nine with Mark Leuchter at the Raven Lounge in Philadelphia where they discussed the Terumah. David Tuchman was interviewed on episode thirty-eight of Tablet Magazine's podcast, Unorthodox. The episode discussed Chametz and the Crossing the Red Sea.

Format 
The show begins with a discussion of the interpreted text followed by an analysis of the reading. The intended audience of the show is modern and secular people rather than religious people.

References

External links 

2012 podcast debuts
Audio podcasts
Religion and spirituality podcasts
Jewish podcasts
American podcasts
Comedy and humor podcasts